The  2011 Baltimore mayoral election was held on November 8, 2011. Because Baltimore's electorate is overwhelmingly Democratic, Stephanie Rawlings-Blake's victory in the Democratic primary on September 13, 2011 all but assured her of victory in the general election.

, this was the last time the Republican candidate finished second in the general election.

Background and candidates
Sheila Dixon, the winner of the previous mayoral election, was forced from office following a 2010 conviction. Therefore, city council president Stephanie Rawlings-Blake became mayor for the final year of what had been Dixon's term, and subsequently ran for election to a full term. Other candidates for the Democratic nomination included state senator Catherine Pugh; Otis Rolley, a former administrator in city government, Frank M. Conaway Sr., the only person, other than Rawlings-Blake, in the race to have won a citywide election, and former councilman Jody Landers

Primary election results 
These are the results for the 2011 Democratic primary, as reported on the City of Baltimore's official website.

General election campaign

General election results

The General Election was held on November 8, 2011.  The results were as follows:

Other city elections
All other Baltimore city officers were also up for election simultaneously with the mayor, including the fourteen members of the Baltimore City Council (elected from single-member districts) and the City Council President and City Comptroller (both elected citywide).  Incumbent comptroller Joan Pratt ran unopposed in both the Democratic primary and the general election.

References

Baltimore
2011
Baltimore